Not to be confused with India Herald, the website of the same name.

India Herald  was a newspaper published in Madras, Madras Presidency, British India. It was founded by Humphreys, an Englishman. It was initially published without obtaining permission from the government, for which offense Humphreys was arrested and deported. Although arrested for unauthorised publication, he managed to escape from the ship on which he was to be deported to England.

References

External Links 
 

Newspapers established in 1795
Publications established in 1795
Publications with year of disestablishment missing
Defunct weekly newspapers
Defunct newspapers published in India
History of Chennai
English-language newspapers published in India
1795 establishments in India
Madras Presidency